Inflammatory Bowel Diseases is a monthly peer-reviewed medical journal covering all aspects of inflammatory bowel disease. It was established in 1995 and is published by Oxford University Press. It is the official journal of the Crohn's & Colitis Foundation. The editor-in-chief is Fabio Cominelli (Case Western Reserve University). According to the Journal Citation Reports, the journal has a 2016 impact factor of 4.525, ranking it 15th out of 79 journals in the category "Gastroenterology & Hepatology".

References

External links

Gastroenterology and hepatology journals
Publications established in 1995
Monthly journals
Lippincott Williams & Wilkins academic journals
English-language journals